Jason Daniel Polan (July 17, 1982 – January 27, 2020) was an American artist born in Ann Arbor, Michigan who lived and worked in New York City. Polan's illustrations have been published in The New Yorker, The New York Times, Metropolis Magazine, and Timothy McSweeney's Quarterly Concern, among others.

Other projects launched by Polan included; the Every Piece Of Art in The Museum Of Modern Art Book, a comic book for Jack Spade, the Millard Fillmore $13 Bill (printed by Fritz Swanson at the Manchester Press), and the "Every Person in New York" project.

Polan founded the Taco Bell Drawing Club in 2005. The club met every week at the Taco Bell on Union Square. Polan lived in Franklin, Michigan with his parents and family. He graduated from University of Michigan, in 2004, with dual degrees in anthropology and art and design. In Ann Arbor, he painted the "Ant Alley" mural on Maynard Street. 

Polan died on January 27, 2020, in New York City from cancer.  He was 37.

References

External links
 Artist's Website
 Taco Bell Drawing Club Website
 20x200 Artist Profile
 Jason Polan's Please Trust Me at Lump Gallery article by Dave Delcambre
  Jason Polan by Letizia Rossi
 Dejour Cultural Commentary on Jason Polan
 Hello My Name is Art article
 Article from The Michigan Daily
 Metropolis POV article illustration
 OP-ART; Thirsting for Fountains NY Times
 McSweeney's Issue 30 article
Ant Alley, Ann Arbor

1982 births
2020 deaths
American illustrators
Artists from Ann Arbor, Michigan
Artists from New York City
People from Franklin, Michigan
University of Michigan alumni
American male artists
21st-century American artists
Deaths from cancer in New York (state)